Gymea Technology High School (abbreviated as GTHS) is a technology-oriented, government-funded and co-educational high school, located on the Princes Highway in the suburb of Gymea, in the Sutherland Shire, Sydney, New South Wales, Australia, next to Gymea TAFE.

Gymea Technology High School achieves average marks in the NSW Higher School Certificate (HSC). It has been recognised as a school in technology by the New South Wales Department of Education and Training and Apple Computer. Gymea Technology High School also performs adequately in many other academic activities, such as public speaking, debating, sport and UNSW school competitions. Gymea THS was opened in 1963 and has been a technology-oriented secondary school since it first opened.

School site 

The school site is open to students at 7:50 am and closes at 3:50 pm. The school hours operate between 8:40 am and 3:00 pm, except on Mondays when the school closes at 2:10 pm.

More than half the area of the school site is devoted to playing fields and tennis courts as well as other outdoor areas for use by students. A school canteen is provided for students to use before school, during recess and at lunch.

Renovations in 2007 saw the surface of the quadrangle resurfaced and other facilities improved, with shaded areas for students to sit during the summer months and open areas for ball games such as handball as well as soccer, football, and basketball. In 2010, the remodelling and updating of all science labs were completed and in 2011 a modern commercial-grade kitchen was installed for hospitality students. In 2016, the school finished a revamp of their technology facilities, combining the previously scattered computer labs into one central location. In 2022, the school implemented table tennis courts for sports students and recreational use.

Bell Times

Faculties

Computing Studies
Computer Studies is taught in Years 7 and 8. It can then be chosen as an elective for Years 9 and 10. In Years 11 and 12, students can choose from Information Technology (VET), Information Process And Technology, Software Design and Development and Industrial Technology - Multimedia. The school has 6 computer rooms in total with these evenly split between Macs and PC. All computer rooms have access to colour and B&W printing and scanning.

There is also a Gifted and Talented Technology class which has an accelerated course providing students with the opportunity to complete work above the grade norm.

Many ordinary classrooms have been outfitted with interactive whiteboards and wireless access points have been installed across the school site for both staff and students to use with their BYOD (Bring Your Own Devices) devices.

PDHPE
PDHPE is compulsory up to the end of Year 10. In Years 11 and 12, PDHPE is optional and is taught in the subjects of Community and Family Studies, Childhood and Sports.

LOTE
Language has been removed from the curriculum of the school. However, previous language subjects have included French and Japanese, both of which have been removed due to their respective teachers leaving the school.

English
English is the only subject that is compulsory throughout the entire duration of a student's enrolment.
All levels of English are taught which includes E.S.L, Standard, Advanced English, English Studies plus two extension levels.

Music
Gymea Technology High School has a wide range of musical programs and facilities including a grand piano and portable staging. Recently the school hall has been refitted with digital LED lights and a digital sound system to provide students with sound facilities. This subject, along with other creative arts, must be studied for at least 100 hours between Year 7 and Year 10.

Creative Arts
Gymea Technology High School has two classrooms dedicated to visual arts, both of which have extensive art supplies and major project rooms to work in. Students have the opportunity to study other creative arts subjects including drama, graphic technologies, dance, photography, creative writing and creative design. In Years 11 and 12, students have the choice to study multiple creative arts courses.

Science
The school has 5 classrooms that serve as science laboratories. Science is compulsory up to the end of Year 10. In Years 11 and 12, science is optional and is taught in the subjects Chemistry, Physics, Biology and Senior Science.

Mathematics
Mathematics is compulsory until the end of Year 11. In Years 11 and 12, Mathematics is taught in both General and Advanced Maths, plus two extension levels for those who wish to pursue the study of math further.

Curriculum

In Year 8, Students have the opportunity to study 6 of the following electives for Years 9 and 10:

 Child Studies
 Commerce
 Creative Writing
 Dance
 Design and Technology
 Drama
 Engineering in Technology
 Food Technology
 Forensic Archaeology
 Industrial Technology - Multimedia
 Music
 Photographic and Digital Media
 Physical Activity and Sports Studies
 Visual Arts

In Years 11 and 12, students have the opportunity to study the following courses:

 Aboriginal Studies
 Ancient History
 Biology
 Business Studies
 Chemistry
 Community & Family Studies
 Construction & Landscaping
 Dance
 Design & Technology
 Drama
 Economics
 English Advanced
 English Extension 1
 English Extension 2
 English Standard
 English Studies
 Food Technology
 Geography
 History Extension
 Hospitality – Kitchen Operations
 Industrial Technology – Multimedia
 Information & Digital Technology
 Information Processes & Technology
 Investigating Science
 Legal Studies
 Marine Studies
 Mathematics Advanced
 Mathematics Extension 1
 Mathematics Extension 2
 Mathematics Standard
 Modern History
 Music
 Personal Development, Health & Physical Education
 Physics
 Science Extension
 Society & Culture
 Software Design & Development
 Sports Lifestyle and Recreation
 Visual Arts

Controversies

In 2017, two students were admitted to the hospital after drug incidents at Gymea Technology High School. The two students were only admitted a few weeks from each other; the first occurring on February 17, and the second occurring on March 2. A parent was seeking answers for the school's alleged failure to follow standard procedure, neglecting police involvement.

In the earlier incident, an unnamed Year 9 was admitted to the hospital for five hours after allegedly taking a restricted ADHD drug from another student. Reportedly, at least three other students were involved in the incident. The girl, whose parents asked to be anonymous, was admitted for hyperventilating and then experienced difficulty breathing.

In the second incident, another student was admitted to the hospital and then released, police said.

According to Sutherland Police Jeff Dean, the school didn't report the first incident formally nor immediately, violating the NSW Department of Education's policy on drug-related incidents. However, the NSW Department of Education denied these claims.
Although the Department hasn't revealed what action has been taken against the students, they have said they have been dealt with.

A parent said that his daughter received a 20-day suspension after the ADHD drug incident. He said he was more concerned over the school's lack of following the proper procedure than his daughter's suspension. He said that the school told him they would be taking the matter to the police three days after the incident and suspending his daughter. After not receiving a call on a report, he had to go to the police himself to report the incident.

See also 

 List of government schools in New South Wales
 Education in Australia

References

External links 
 Gymea Technology High School NSW Home Website
 Gymea Technology High School Community Website

Public high schools in Sydney
Sutherland Shire
Educational institutions established in 1963
1963 establishments in Australia